Keowee Key is a lakeside community and census-designated place (CDP) in Oconee County, South Carolina, United States. It is considered part of the Salem community. It was first listed as a CDP prior to the 2020 census with a population of 2,716.

The CDP is on the eastern edge of Oconee County, on a peninsula extending into Lake Keowee, a reservoir on the Keowee River and Little River. The arm of the lake on the Little River borders the western side of the peninsula, while the Keowee River arm forms the eastern side and is the border with Pickens County. The two arms of the lake join via a small channel in the south part of the CDP; to the south, across the channel and outside the CDP, is the Oconee Nuclear Station power plant. The Keowee River is a south-flowing tributary of the Seneca River, a main tributary of the Savannah River.

South Carolina Highways 130 and 183 traverse the CDP. SC 130 (Stamp Creek Road) leads northwest  to Salem, while SC 183 (Pickens Highway) leads west  to Walhalla, the Oconee county seat. The two highways merge to form Rochester Highway, which leaves the CDP to the south. SC 130 continues south down Rochester Highway  to Seneca, and SC 183 turns east and leads  to Pickens.

Demographics

2020 census

Note: the US Census treats Hispanic/Latino as an ethnic category. This table excludes Latinos from the racial categories and assigns them to a separate category. Hispanics/Latinos can be of any race.

References 

Census-designated places in Oconee County, South Carolina
Census-designated places in South Carolina